The 6th Armored Division ("Super Sixth") was an armored division of the United States Army during World War II. It was formed with a cadre from the 2nd Armored Division.

History

The division was activated on 15 February 1942 at Fort Knox out of "surplus" elements of the reorganized 1st and 2nd Armored Divisions, with Brig. Gen. Carlos Brewer assigned as its first commanding general. It moved to Camp Chaffee on 15 March 1942 to make way for other Armored units, and then completed its assembly and unit training. The division then participated in the VIII Corps Louisiana Maneuvers from 25 August 1942, and then returned to Camp Chaffee on 21 September 1942. The 6th AD then moved to Camp Young at the Desert Training Center on 10 October 1942, and participated in the first California Maneuvers. The 6th AD then moved to Camp Cooke to continue its training, where it was reorganized, losing its "heavy" organization of two armored regiments and one armored infantry regiment in favor of a "light" organization of three tank battalions and three armored infantry battalions. Maj. Gen. Robert W. Grow assumed command of the Division at Camp Cooke, California in May 1943 and commanded the division through the war until 30 July 1945. The 6th AD then staged at Camp Shanks, New York on 3 February 1944, departed the New York Port of Embarkation on 11 February 1944, and arrived in England on 23 February 1944.

After continuing its training in England, 6th AD landed on Utah Beach in Normandy on 19 July 1944 as a follow-on unit, and went on the offensive as separate combat commands in the Cotentin Peninsula in support of the Normandy Campaign.

Composition 
The division was composed of the following units:

 Headquarters
 Headquarters Company
 Combat Command A
 Combat Command B
 Combat Command Reserve
 15th Tank Battalion
 68th Tank Battalion
 69th Tank Battalion
 9th Armored Infantry Battalion
 44th Armored Infantry Battalion
 50th Armored Infantry Battalion
 Headquarters and Headquarters Battery,  6th Armored Division Artillery
 128th Armored Field Artillery Battalion
 212th Armored Field Artillery Battalion
 231st Armored Field Artillery
 86th Cavalry Reconnaissance Squadron (Mechanized)
 25th Armored Engineer Battalion
 146th Armored Signal Company
 Headquarters and Headquarters Company, 6th Armored Division Trains
 128th Ordnance Maintenance Battalion
 76th Armored Medical Battalion
 Military Police Platoon
 Band

Combat chronicle

At the end of the Normandy Campaign, 6th AD assembled at Le Mesnil on 25 July 1944. 6th AD then passed through 8th Infantry Division to clear the heights near Le Bingard on 27 July 1944, and Combat Command A secured a bridgehead across the Sienne (river) near Pont de la Roque on 29 July 1944, and overran Granville on 31 July 1944. 6th AD then returned to Avranches, where it relieved 4th AD and secured the area bridges.

In mid-August in Europe, the 6th Armored Division moved down to Lorient, where it was relieved by the 94th Infantry Division in September. Elements of the division participated in the Battle for Brest (7 August - 19 September 1944).

The 6th then turned east and cut across France, reaching the Saar in November. It crossed the Nied River on 11–12 November, against strong opposition, reaching the German border on 6 December, and established and maintained defensive positions in the vicinity of Saarbrücken.

On 23 December, the division was ordered north of Metz to take part in the Battle of the Bulge, and took over a sector along the south bank of the Sauer. The 6th was heavily engaged in the battle for Bastogne, finally driving the enemy back across the Our River into Germany by late January 1945.

After a short period of rehabilitation, the division resumed the offensive, penetrated the Siegfried Line, crossed the Prum, reached the Rhine River at Worms on 21 March, and set up a counterreconnaissance screen along its west bank. The 6th crossed the Rhine at Oppenheim on 25 March, drove on to Frankfurt, crossed the Main, captured Bad Nauheim, and continued to advance eastward, and surrounded and captured Mühlhausen on 4–5 April. After repulsing a light counterattack, it moved forward 60 miles to cross the Saale River and assisted in freeing Allied prisoners of war and the German concentration camp at Buchenwald. The division raced on, took Leipzig, crossed the River Zwickau Mulde at Rochlitz on 15 April 1945, and stopped, pending the arrival of the Red Army. Defensive positions along the Mulde River were held until the end of hostilities in Europe.

The division arrived at Camp Shanks, New York on 18 September 1945 and was inactivated.

Casualties

Total battle casualties: 4,670
Killed in action: 1,169
Wounded in action: 3,667
Missing in action: 88
Prisoner of war: 83

Official history
At the end of World War II, two 6th Armored Division G3 officers, Majors Paul L. Bogen and Clyde J. Burke along with Aide-de-Camp Captain Cyrus R. Shockey, compiled a Combat Record of the Sixth Armored Division in the European Theatre of Operations 18 July 1944 – 8 May 1945. The official history by George F. Hofmann, The Super Sixth: History of the 6th Armored Division in World War II (1975, reprinted 2000) has been called by World War II scholar Martin Blumenson, a "first-rate military history." He also noted that General Patton called the 6th AD one of the two best divisions in his Third Army.

References

External links
Super Sixth: The story of Patton's 6th Armored Division in WW II
Brest to Bastogne: The Story of the 6th Armored Division
Army Amphibian and Tank Battalions in the Battle of Saipan 15 June-9 July 1944
Saipan: The Beginning of the End (773rd Amphibian Tractor Battalion and 708th Amphibian Tank Battalion are discussed in citation number 55 under "Yellow Beach and Agingan Point)

06th Armored Divisin, U.S.
Armored Division, U.S. 06th
Military units and formations established in 1942
1942 establishments in the United States
Military units and formations disestablished in 1956
1942 establishments in Kentucky